Countess Palatine Maria Francisca of Sulzbach (Maria Franziska, Pfalzgräfin von Sulzbach; 15 June 1724 – 15 November 1794), was a Countess Palatine of Zweibrücken-Birkenfeld by marriage to Frederick Michael, Count Palatine of Zweibrücken-Birkenfeld. 

Born in Schwetzingen, she was the fifth child of Joseph Karl, Count Palatine of Sulzbach and Countess Palatine Elizabeth Auguste Sophie of Neuburg. From her six siblings, only she and two older sisters survive adulthood: Elisabeth Auguste and Maria Anna.

Life

Her father was the designated successor both of his own father Theodore Eustace, Count Palatine of Sulzbach and of his father-in-law Charles III Philip, Elector Palatine, but he never took possession of his inheritance due to his early death in 1729. Maria Franziska's older sister Elisabeth Auguste later married the next heir of the Palatinate Electorate, Charles Theodore, Elector of Bavaria. After the death of Charles Theodore in February 1799 without surviving legitimate offspring, the Palatinate and Bavaria were inherited by Maria Franziska's youngest son Maximilian IV Joseph (later King Maximilian I of Bavaria); thus, Maria Franziska became the ancestor of all the Bavarian Kings until 1918 and the still living royal branch of the Wittelbachs.

On 6 February 1746, Maria Franziska married Frederick Michael, Count Palatine of Zweibrücken-Birkenfeld. From 1760, after having given birth to five children, the relationship with her husband began to deteriorate.

According to herself she was seduced "by the bad example of the court", and began an affair with an actor from Mannheim.  When she became pregnant, Maria Franziska was banished from the court.  In Strasbourg she gave birth to a son. She was then confined to a semi-detention in a series of monasteries, firstly at the Ursuline in Metz and then to the Augustinians of Bonnevoie in the Duchy of Luxembourg. After the death of her husband in 1767, she was allowed to return to Sulzbach Castle.

Maria Franziska died in Sulzbach and was buried in the local parish church. Her heart was buried separately and since 1983 was located in the Shrine of Our Lady of Altötting.

Issue

Ancestry

References

Bibliography 
Oskar Klausner: Die Familienzweige der pfälzischen Wittelsbacher. Die ersten Wittelsbacher, die Kurlinie, die Seitenlinien. Editorial Schimper, Heidelberg 1995.
Karl Weich: Mannheim - das neue Jerusalem. Die Jesuiten in Mannheim 1720–1773. Palatium-Editorial, Mannheim 1997, p. 142, 151.

External websites 

 thePeerage.com

1724 births
1794 deaths
People from Schwetzingen
House of Wittelsbach
Countesses Palatine of Sulzbach
German royalty
Countesses Palatine of Zweibrücken